Hoplocorypha striata is a species of praying mantis found in Namibia.

See also
List of mantis genera and species

References

Endemic fauna of Namibia
Hoplocorypha
Mantodea of Africa
Insects described in 1930